Kjell Magne Fredheim (born 3 February 1928 in Os, Hedmark, died 28 October 2006) was a Norwegian politician for the Labour Party.

He was elected to the Norwegian Parliament from Hedmark in 1969, and was re-elected on four occasions. He had previously served as a deputy representative during the term 1965–1969.

On the local level he was a member of Åsnes municipality council from 1963 to 1967, serving the last two years as deputy mayor. From 1963 to 1967 he was also a member of Hedmark county council.

Outside politics he worked as a journalist in Arbeidets Rett from 1954 to 1955, and then embarked on a longer career in Glåmdalen.

References

1928 births
2006 deaths
People from Åsnes
Members of the Storting
Labour Party (Norway) politicians
Hedmark politicians
20th-century Norwegian politicians
20th-century Norwegian journalists